Greatest Hits is Neil Young's third compilation album after Decade and Lucky Thirteen. Eleven of the first twelve tracks appear on Decade, and the disc spans his solo career from 1969 through 1992. On the rear cover of the album, Young comments that the tracks were selected "based on original record sales, airplay and known download history."

Mastering
All tracks on this album were mastered using the HDCD process, which Young has been utilizing for his studio work since 1995.  The album was also released as a high-resolution DVD Video disc with 24bit 96 kHz audio, and in a two-disc format including the audio album plus a bonus DVD with videos for "Rockin' in the Free World" and "Harvest Moon". Extensive notes on the remastering process can be found on Young's website.

On the press release, Young said:

Track listing

7" single

Issued exclusively with the vinyl edition of the album

Charts

Weekly charts

Year-end charts

Certifications

References

External links
 Greatest Hits Technical Notes at neilyoung.com (requires Flash)

2004 greatest hits albums
Neil Young compilation albums
2004 video albums
Music video compilation albums
Reprise Records compilation albums
Reprise Records video albums
Albums produced by Neil Young
Albums produced by David Crosby
Albums produced by Graham Nash
Albums produced by Stephen Stills
Albums produced by Elliot Mazer
Albums produced by Ben Keith
Albums produced by Niko Bolas